Ashley Hicklin (born 1985) is an English singer, songwriter, and record producer. He co-owns Unified-Songs, a UK based music publishing/management company and has written songs for artists such as Tiësto, Oliver Heldens, R3hab, Hardwell, Timmy Trumpet, Lost Kings, Feder, Duncan Laurence, and Waylon, including more than ten No.1 chart releases and over twenty Top-10 chart releases.

Biography

Early life
Ashley Hicklin was raised in his parents’ pub on the North-East coast of England in Scarborough, North Yorkshire. He first began as a singer-songwriter performing at open mic nights in the pub, at the age of 13.

As a writer
In 2008, the European CEO of EMI Publishing (Peter Ende) saw a live video of Hicklin performing for BBC Introducing. Hicklin signed a deal with EMI Publishing and in less than six months had co-written several chart hits for other artists across Europe, including Johan Palm's single Emma-lee which reached No. 1 in Sweden.

Hicklin went on to collaborate with the teams behind Lana Del Rey, Felix Jaehn, Tiësto, Natasha Bedingfield, James Morrison, Hurts, Amy Winehouse, Sugababes and various other international acts. Hicklin is very active in the dance music scene as a writer and vocalist under the moniker Bright Sparks. Notable releases include the Tiësto song On My Way, the Hardwell song Summer Air, the Feder song Keep Us Apart, the Oliver Heldens song Somebody, the Klingande song Messiah, the Timmy Trumpet song Friday and Lost Kings release Feather.

Eurovision Song Contest entries
Hicklin has written the following Eurovision Song Contest entries:

In 2018, Hicklin wrote two songs for the UK's national selection Eurovision: You Decide. "You", performed by Jaz Ellington and "Astronaut", performed by Liam Tamne.

As a publisher
In 2015, Hicklin co-founded Unified Songs, an independent music publisher and management company based in Edinburgh. They have residential recordings studios where they regularly host songwriting camps.

References

1985 births
Living people
English male singer-songwriters
English composers
People from Scarborough, North Yorkshire
People educated at Caistor Grammar School
Alumni of Leeds College of Music
21st-century English singers
21st-century clarinetists
21st-century British male singers